Scott Allen (born 30 January 1975) is a former Australian rules footballer who played with Footscray in the Australian Football League (AFL).

A utility, Allen was selected with pick 59 in the 1992 National Draft, from Portarlington. He appeared in just 15 senior games for Footscray but played finals football in each of his first two seasons.

Allen would later play for the Clarence Football Club in the Tasmanian Football League.

References

External links
 
 

1975 births
Australian rules footballers from Victoria (Australia)
Western Bulldogs players
Clarence Football Club players
Tasmanian Devils Football Club players
Living people